Sharat may refer to:
 Al-Sharat, a region in Jordan and Saudi Arabia
 Sharat (season), a season in India
 Sharat, an Indian given name (for a list of people, see )

See also 
 Sharad (disambiguation)